Greatest Hits is a best of album by the French Rumba Catalana band Gipsy Kings, which was released in 1994 in Europe.

Overview
More than a simple compilation of previous albums, it also includes the 1992 single "Pida Me La", a studio release of "Galaxia", "Allegria" and "La Dona" (previously released live on Allegria), a more energetic release of "Vamos a Bailar" from the LP version and the popular party Medley (consisting of a mix of Bamboleo, Volare, Djobi Djoba, Pida Me La and Baila Me].

The Japanese edition of this album includes an extra track, "Este Mundo" (from the album Este Mundo) as track #18 (the "Medley" is track #19).

A similar compilation, The Best of the Gipsy Kings, was released a year later in the U.S.; it has a different song order and replaces "Pida Me La", "A Mi Manera", "Tu Quieres Volver", "Soy", "La Quiero" and "Allegria" with "Viento Del Arena", "Quiero Saber", "Montaña", "Trista Pena", "Love & Liberté" and the previously unreleased "A Tu Vera". Also, while "La Dona" and "Galaxia" on the Greatest Hits album are the studio versions, the ones on The Best of the Gipsy Kings are live versions. The song "Escucha Me" is also slightly different.

Track listing

Charts and certifications

Weekly charts

Year-end charts

Sales and certifications

References

External links
Greatest Hits at Discogs
Greatest Hits at gipsykings.net

Gipsy Kings albums
1994 greatest hits albums